The Dorrigo railway line is a closed railway line in the north of New South Wales, Australia. It branches from the North Coast line at Glenreagh.

Original scheme 
The Dorrigo line was intended to be part of a much larger rail system linking the ports of Coffs Harbour and Grafton with the Northern and North western lines. The line would have joined with the system at Guyra, Inverell and Werris Creek. These plans never came to fruition and construction work was commenced on only two sections, between Glenreagh and Dorrigo and Guyra and Dorrigo.

Location 
It has a consistently high rainfall and is the main township for the area known as "The Dorrigo" (short for 'The Dorrigo Plateau'). The town is situated in a geographical location which could best be described as mountainous. Being a rainforest area, it has a high rainfall and fertile soil, but it is also given to landslides and land subsidence. It was into this setting that a line of railway was built, encountering many difficulties in its construction.

Development and activities 
On 28 December 1910 the Glenreagh to Dorrigo Railway Act received assent to sanction the construction. It was not until early August 1914 that construction officially commenced. Because of the First World War, a lack of finance and a dispute with the contractor, progress foundered. The contract was terminated on 28 March 1917 and construction passed to the Railway Commissioners who promptly suspended work.

It was almost two years after the end of the First World War that the Railway Commissioners decided to press ahead with construction. Delays occurred due to landslips and washaway and it was not until 27 September 1924 that a construction train reached Dorrigo. Construction was finalised by 5 December and an inspection of the line was conducted by Railways staff on the 10th.

Opening 
The line opened on 23 December 1924.

Operations 
The Dorrigo line was one of the costliest branch railways built in New South Wales. It had some of the steepest gradients and tightest curves on the system and experienced high maintenance and running costs. It experienced repeated losses throughout its entire existence.

Although goods other than timber were carried, timber was the main revenue source for the railway. Just prior to the suspension of services, there were loadings of up to 13 wagons, mainly of timber from Dorrigo. Most of the logs and processed timber were sent to Sydney. In the early days of the line, the NSWGR obtained sleepers for the North Coast region from the area. These were transported by rail to other centres.

Stations 

  Glenreagh
  Timber Top Siding
  Moleton
  Mole Creek Tank
  Lowanna
  Ulong
  Brooklana
  Lloyd
  Cascade
  Briggsvale
  Megan
  Leigh
  Dorrigo

Closure 
The line lost its passenger service on 1 December 1957 and goods services were suspended on 27 October 1972 after flood damage. By the end of December 1972, it was becoming apparent there was little prospect of the line re-opening as the Public Transport Commission, the Authority then charged with operating the State's railways, would give no indication of its intentions.

Dorrigo station remained open until November, 1979, providing staff to facilitate the road transport of goods between there and Raleigh.

Preservation 
Parts of the line are used by heritage railway organisations Glenreagh Mountain Railway and Dorrigo Steam Railway and Museum.
There was a push to try and save the glenreagh station but due to the condition it was in artc wouldnt allow a lease to allow a group of people fix the station.

See also

 Rail transport in New South Wales

References

External links
 Reading of Act of Parliament to close line retrieved 21 July 2014
 Continuation of Reading of Act of Parliament to close line retrieved 21 July 2014
 2nd reading
 
 
Dorrigo 360 Aerial Panorama

Closed regional railway lines in New South Wales
Railway lines opened in 1924
Railway lines closed in 1972
Standard gauge railways in Australia
1924 establishments in Australia
1972 disestablishments in Australia
Northern Tablelands